The following article lists three Orders of Battle for the Iranian Army at different periods. 
Note, that this is not the order of battle of the Iranian Revolutionary Guards but of the regular ground forces (Artesh).

Army Order of Battle (Localities)

Army Order of Battle, c. 1998

Imperial Army Order of Battle, c. 1970s

References

Ground Forces of Islamic Republic of Iran Army
Iranian Army Ground Forces